Peace is an album by multi-instrumentalist Ira Sullivan which was recorded in 1978 and released on the Galaxy label in 1981.

Reception

The AllMusic review by Scott Yanow stated "The remarkable Ira Sullivan (who on this album plays trumpet, flugelhorn, flute, alto flute, soprano and tenor with equal skill) teams up with the underrated guitarist Joe Diorio, bassist John Heard, drummer Billy Higgins and percussionist Kenneth Nash for a diverse program of music".

Track listing
 "I Get a Kick Out of You" (Cole Porter) – 4:19
 "Send in the Clowns" (Stephen Sondheim) – 7:37
 "Gong" (Joe Diorio) – 6:01
 "Vento Bravo" (Edu Lobo, Paulo César Pinheiro) – 10:05
 "Peace" (Horace Silver) – 9:19

Personnel
Ira Sullivan – flute, alto flute, soprano saxophone, tenor saxophone, trumpet, flugelhorn
Joe Diorio – guitar 
John Heard – bass
Billy Higgins – drums 
Kenneth Nash – percussion

References

Galaxy Records albums
Ira Sullivan albums
1979 albums